The 2012 Lamar Hunt U.S. Open Cup was the 99th edition of the U.S. Open Cup, the annual national soccer championship of the United States. It ran from May to August and was organized by the United States Soccer Federation. Seattle Sounders FC of Major League Soccer entered the competition as the three-time defending champions and appeared in their fourth consecutive U.S. Open Cup Final, losing to Sporting Kansas City on August 8, 2012.

For the 2012 tournament, U.S. Soccer increased the main tournament from a 40-club tournament, to a 64-club tournament. All Major League Soccer clubs based in the U.S. received automatic berths. This made the U.S. Open Cup very similar to other domestic knock-out competitions where all top tier clubs earn automatic berths.

The farthest advancing NASL teams were the Minnesota Stars FC, Carolina RailHawks, and San Antonio Scorpions (all beat 1 MLS team), while the farthest advancing USL Pro teams were the Charlotte Eagles, Dayton Dutch Lions, and the Harrisburg City Islanders, who beat 2 MLS sides. All three USL Pro teams advanced a round past their division two NASL counterparts. The farthest advancing USL PDL team was the Michigan Bucks, who advanced to the 4th round after beating an MLS club. An amateur club, Cal FC of the USASA, won 1–0 away to MLS's Portland Timbers in a third round upset.

The winner, Sporting Kansas City, received a cash prize of $100,000 and also qualified for the 2013–14 CONCACAF Champions League (placed in Pot B).

Qualification 

For the first time, all 32 professional teams from the first 3 tiers of American Soccer will be participating. Additionally, 32 teams will also qualify from the USL Premier Development League, National Premier Soccer League, United States Adult Soccer Association, and US Club Soccer.

 † League Champions in 2011
 ‡ League Premiers in 2011
 * Stanislaus United Turlock Express defeated the Bay Area Ambassadors of the NPSL in a play-in game on April 28 to qualify for the First Round.

Brackets 
Home team is listed first, winners are in bold.

Schedule
Note: Scorelines use the standard U.S. convention of placing the home team on the right-hand side of box scores.

First Round 
32 Teams from USL PDL, NPSL, and USASA begin competition.

Second Round 
16 teams from NASL and USL Pro enter.

Third Round 
16 teams from MLS enter.

Fourth Round

Quarterfinals

Semifinals

Final

Top scorers
Statistics current through the Cup Final.

References

External links 
 The Cup.us – Full Coverage of the Lamar Hunt US Open Cup

 
2012
2012 domestic association football cups